Abdilahi Husein Iman Darawal is a Somaliland politician and former senior SNM senior commander.    Darawal belongs to the Arap clan of the wider Isaaq clan family.

See also 

 Politics of Somaliland
 Somali National Movement
 Sheikh San'ani Brigade

References 

1948 births
Living people
Somaliland politicians